The 2018–19 Asian Le Mans Series was the seventh season of the Automobile Club de l'Ouest's Asian Le Mans Series. It is the fourth 24 Hours of Le Mans-based series created by the ACO, following the American Le Mans Series (since merged with the Rolex Sports Car Series to form the United SportsCar Championship), the European Le Mans Series and the FIA World Endurance Championship. The four-event season began at the Shanghai International Circuit on 25 November 2018 and ended at the Sepang International Circuit in Selangor on 24 February 2019.

Calendar
The calendar for the 2018–2019 season was announced on 3 February 2018, featuring four FIA Grade 1 circuits. The series returned to the Shanghai International Circuit for the first time since the 2014 season, with the venue replacing the Zhuhai International Circuit as the opening round of the season.

Entry list

LMP2

LMP3

GT

Results
Bold indicates overall winner.

Teams Championships

Points are awarded according to the following structure:

LMP2 Teams Championship

LMP2 Am Teams Championship

LMP3 Teams Championship

GT Teams Championship

GT Am Teams Championship

GTC Teams Championship

Drivers championships
Points are awarded according to the following structure:

LMP2 Drivers Championship

LMP2 Am Drivers Championship

LMP3 Drivers Championship

GT Drivers Championship

GT Am Drivers Championship

GTC Drivers Championship

Notes

References

External links
 

Asian Le Mans Series seasons
Asian Le Mans Series
Asian Le Mans Series
Le Mans Series
Le Mans Series